Surgana is a census town and taluka in Nashik District in the Indian state of Maharashtra.

History
During the British Raj era, Surgana State was one of several princely state governed by the Pawar dynasty of kshatriya Kolis. It was the only state of the Nasik Agency.

Recent 
55 bordering villages of Surgana taluka has submitted memorandum to join Gujarat. The efforts has been made by Surgana taluka Sangharsh Samiti.

Geography
It has an average elevation of 533 metres (1748 feet). It is about 90 km from Nashik.

Demographics
In the 2001 India census, Surgana had a population of 6,147. Males constituted 54% of the population and females 46%. Surgana had an average literacy rate of 70%, higher than the national average of 59.5%: male literacy was 75%, and female literacy was 64%. In 2001 in Surgana, 13% of the population was under 6 years of age.

References

Cities and towns in Nashik district
Talukas in Maharashtra